

Derived from the Jew's harp of the Hmong people, Đàn môi (: Đàn môi, "lip lute") is the Vietnamese name of a traditional musical instrument widely used in minority ethnic groups in Vietnam (including the Jrai "Rang Leh"). An inward orientated ("the lamella points inwards towards the mouth") idioglot (noncomposite: "the tongue and frame are of the same piece of material"), mouth harp somewhat similar to the metal heteroglot/compound jaw harp, the dan moi, rather than being held against the teeth while being played, like a jaw harp, is held against the lips while being played.

This gives much more flexibility  to the player, leaving them freer to shape their oral cavity  as a resonance chamber to amplify the instrument.

See also 
 Jaw harp
 Kouxian

Sources

External links

Video 

 "" : pictures, video clips, articles on dan moi, ''haidanmoi.multiply.com

Vietnamese musical instruments
Idioglot guimbardes and jaw harps
Hmong culture